Rajiv Münch (born 29 July 1989), better known by his stage name Munchi, is a Dutch producer and DJ of Dominican descent, born and raised in Rotterdam, Netherlands. He is credited to have made "the first truly original work" for moombahton, taking "the sound to the next level" and being the originator of moombahcore. Even though Munchi is credited mainly for moombahton, it was his versatility and unique production style that brought him into public attention. Notably producing a wide selection of genres and incorporating these elements in his music. This is best represented in the Murda Sound debut on T&A Records, consisting of a wide variety of genres doing Munchi's versatility justice. In December 2010 Munchi was featured with 3 tracks on M.I.A.'s Vicki Leekx mixtape, and in July 2012 on Azealia Banks' Fantasea mixtape, with the track "Esta Noche."

Background 

Munchi started making music in 2004 when his brother bought him Acid Pro. He met future collaborator David Heartbreak via MySpace in 2009. After Munchi mentioned Dave Nada's Moombahton EP, Heartbreak wanted to learn more about the genre and invited him to Charlotte. While touring the United States in March 2011, Munchi suffered a seizure caused by an intracerebral hemorrhage. After learning of Münch's condition, fellow producers DJ Ayres, Tittsworth and Dave Nada organised a fundraiser "to pay for surgery, medication and flight home for the non-American insured producer". He spent 9 hours in coma and 11 days in the hospital, but when noticing the overwhelming support it inspired him to recover faster during 2011.

Discography

Free EPs

2009:
 Dubstep Promo - [SEL-PR001]
 Baltimore Club Promo - [SEL-PR002]

2010:
 Baile Funk Promo - [SEL-PR003]
 B-more 2.0/2.1 + B-more Dub VIP's - [SEL-PR004]
 Moombahton Promo - [SEL-PR005]
 Munbreakton EP (with David Heartbreak) - [SEL-PR006]
 Cumbia XXX - [SEL-PR007]
 Kuduro Promo - [SEL-PR008]
 Fuck H&M (with David Heartbreak) - [SEL-PR009]

2011:
 H/M (with David Heartbreak) - [SEL-PR010]
 Rotterdam Juke EP - [SEL-PR011]

2012:
 3 Ball Dub Ep - [SEL-PR012]
 Rotterdam Trap EP - [SEL-PR013]

2013:

 Vol. I: Skulltrap - [SEL-VL001]
 Moombahton Is Dead (V/A) - [SELPR001]

2014:

 Boom Bap Back (with Jon Kwest) - [SELPR002]
 Vol. II: Rasterinha (Contos Do Caderninho Verde) - [SELPR003]
 Vol. III: Perreo 101 - [SELPR004]

EPs

2010:
 Murda Sound EP - [T&A019]

2012:
 Moombahtonista EP - [MAD136]

2016:
 Naffie Back/Pa Lo Under EP - [SEL003]

Compilations

2010:
 Summer of Moombahton - [Self Released]

2011:
 Verano del Moombahton - [Self Released]

Mixtapes

2010:
 M.I.A. - Vicki Leekx

Singles

2008:
 Munchi - Nex Aan Te Doen Prt. 1

2010:
 Munchi - Break Your Fucking Face
 David Banner ft Lil' Flip - Like A Pimp (Munchi Has Bad Table Manners Moombahton Edit)
 Juvenile - Back That Ass Up (Munchi Reggeton Edit)
 Datsik - Firepower (Munchi Moombahcore Rmx)
 TC - Where's My Money (Caspa Rmx - Munchi's Kinda Aggressive Right Now Moombahcore Rmx)

2011:
 Soulja Boy - Pretty Boy Swag (Diplo & Munchi's 'Dude, I Can Make This In 5 Min With Acid Pro' Edit)
 Munchi ft M.I.A. - Murda Sound VIP
 Munchi ft Chito Rock - Bebe De To
 Munchi - Despair - Moombahsoul Vol. I
 Munchi - Gracias - Moombahton Massive II
 Munchi - Jimi Knows - Verano Del Moombahton
 Munchi - Virtud - Moombahsoul Vol. II
 Nadastrom & Munchi ft Jen Lasher - Say My Name - El Baile Diabluma

2012:
 Munchi ft Lakey - Not Usually
 Munchi - Fuck This
 Munchi - Te Gusta Mi Mambo Mami - Moombah Fiesta Vol. II

2013:
 Bro Safari x Munchi - Sin Compromiso (Munchi's Fuck Bitch Promoters VIP)

2014:
 Munchi ft Isa GT - Isa Te Dijo - Alegria/Isa Te Dijo

2017:
 Munchi - Guess Who's Back

Remixes

2010:
 Steve Starks - Git Em (Munchi Kuduro Rmx)
 Bassanovva - Chickenlover (Munchi Likes Em Fried Moombahton Rmx)
 Dogz & Bumps ft MC Zulu - Carnival Madness (Munchi's Only Beers & Rubbers Rmx)

2011:
 Nguzunguzu - Unfold (Munchi Likes Excessive Amounts Of Bass Mambo Juke Rmx)
 Dillon Francis & Dave Nada - Brazzers Theme (Munchi's Fuck That It's Bangbros Rmx)
 Autodidakt ft Spoek Mathambo - Fake Fred Perry (Munchi Is Muito Random Rmx)
 Buraka Som Sistema - Hangover (Munchi Airhorn Alert Rmx)
 Professor Angel Dust - Go (Munchi Thought Criminal Rmx)
 Bert On Beats - Bone Dat (Munchi's 'Nope This Aint Moombahton Dude' Trap Bubbling Rmx)

2012:
 Noisia - Tommy's Theme (Munchi's Fear Is Weakness Rmx)
 Skrillex – Ruffneck (FULL Flex) (Munchi Anonymous Revolution Rmx)

References

External links 
 Munchi's Discography on Discogs
 My Son The DJ: Ep 7. Munchi

1989 births
Living people
Dutch dance musicians
Dutch DJs
Dutch electronic musicians
Dutch record producers
Moombahcore musicians
Musicians from Rotterdam
Electronic dance music DJs